Closing time may refer to:

Books
 Closing Time (novel), a 1994 novel and sequel to Catch-22 by Joseph Heller
 Closing Time: The True Story of the Goodbar Murder, a 1977 book by Lacey Fosburgh
 "Closing Time", a short story by Neil Gaiman included in the 2006 collection Fragile Things

Music 
 Closing Time (album), a 1973 album by Tom Waits, or the title song
 "Closing Time" (Deacon Blue song), 1991
 "Closing Time" (Hole song), 1993
 "Closing Time" (Semisonic song), 1998
 "Closing Time", a song by Leonard Cohen from The Future, 1992
 "Closing Time", a song by Lyle Lovett from Lyle Lovett, 1986
 "Lounge (Closing Time)", a song by Modest Mouse from The Lonesome Crowded West, 1997

Television 
 "Closing Time" (Beavis and Butt-head)
 "Closing Time" (Doctor Who)
 "Closing Time" (Two Pints of Lager and a Packet of Crisps)

See also 
 Closing time effect
 Business hours
 Last call (bar term)